David Lill (born 17 February 1947) is an English former footballer who played in the Football League for Cambridge United, Hull City and Rotherham United.

External links
 David Lill stats at Neil Brown stat site

English footballers
English Football League players
Rotherham United F.C. players
Cambridge United F.C. players
Hull City A.F.C. players
1947 births
Living people
Association football midfielders